Louis-Pierre Bougie (16 August 1946 - 10 January 2021) was a Canadian painter and printmaker specialized in engraving and etching. He developed his knowledge of intaglio techniques at Atelier Lacourière-Frélaut in Paris, where he worked for fifteen years, and through travel and study in France, Portugal, Poland, Ireland, Finland, and New York. His work is regularly shown in Canadian, American, and European galleries, and is represented in major public and private collections, notably in Québec and New York. Bougie was considered Québec's foremost engraver for the depth and consistency of his work. He died from pneumonia.

Training 
After an introduction to printmaking at École des Beaux-Arts de Montréal, where he attended classes with Angèle Beaudry, Louis-Pierre Bougie studied  in Paris, notably at Lacourière-Frélaut (1979–1993), Atelier Rene Tazé, and Atelier Champfleury, and in Vancouver and Montréal. Additional training in Strasbourg (1979–1982), Cracow (1980), Helsinki (2003), and Buenos Aires (2006) introduced him to a compagnonnage-like approach to the transmission of printmaking skills.
 2006 - Québec artist residency,  Buenos Aires, Argentina
 2003 - Québec artist residency, Helsinki, Finland
 1996 - Québec artist residency, New York City, United States
 1992–1993 - Atelier Champfleury, Atelier Lacourière-Frélaut, and Atelier René Tazé, Paris, France, and Atelier Sagamie, Alma
 1988 - Atelier Lacourière-Frélaut, Paris, France (engraving)
 1984–1987 - Atelier René Tazé, Paris, France
 1982–1987 - Atelier Circulaire, Montreal
 1980 - Stuido Lotozowska 3, Cracow, Poland
 1979–1987 - Cité Internationale and Lacourière-Frélaut, Paris, France (engraving)
 1979–1982 – Visiting artist, Arts Décoratifs, Strasbourg (lithography); Ateliers Champfleury (lithography) and Lacourière-Frélaut, Paris, France
 1975–1982- Atelier Luc Nadeau, Montréal, and Baie St-Paul
 1975–1977- Atelier Arachel (lithography, etching) and Atelier Graff, Montreal
 1972–1973 - Vancouver School of Art (independent student), Vancouver
 1969–1972 - Atelier de Recherche Graphique, Guilde Graphiqu, Montreal
 1967–1970 - École des Beaux-Arts de Montréal (independent student with Angèle Beaudry)

Work 
Louis-Pierre Bougie produced a considerable body of engraved and painted works that applied traditional techniques such as burin, aquatint, and chine collé to contemporary printmaking. An heir to Goya, Blake, and Rops, he had developed an original monotype technique that combined engraving with live figure drawing in a reversal of traditional processes: the paper is first drawn with pierre noir and reworked with acrylic before receiving a print from a copper plate marked with spit-bite and drypoint. The finished print captures all elements with exceptional transparency, bringing its subject to light in the true sense of illumination. In Bougie's work, engraving was a process that both opened and sealed spaces. Desire and imagination inhabited matter in unexpected ways, and appearance was literally cast in a different light (through highlights and illumination), giving us back a bit of ourselves.

Influence and involvement 
In the early 1980s, while also conducting residencies at major printmaking studios abroad (including Paris and Strasbourg), Bougie joined forces with Catherine Farish, Pierre-Léon Tétreault, Kittie Bruneau, and other print-based artists to found Atelier Circulaire. Throughout his career, he promoted the work of Quebec printmakers both locally and outside Canada. He also collaborated closely with writers and poets. In 1983, the poets Gaston Miron and Michael La Chance together signed a telegram to Bougie: 
We salute Louis-Pierre Bougie, one of those rare souls who is always a step ahead, continuously opening the way to new possibilities and escaping the bounds of mortal time. 
As an engraver and etcher of international renown, he has brought greater visibility to Québec printmaking and has been pivotal in inviting printmakers from abroad to take part in major collaborations with Québec, including artist's books, residencies, and exchanges between Québec and other countries. He has also helped foster talent in Québec, both through his work with artists at Atelier Circulaire and as the organizer and curator of numerous exhibitions.

Selected exhibitions 
Bougie's work benefited from the support of major curators such as Léo Rosshandler, Bernard Lévy, Céline Mayrand, Gilles Daigneault, Claude Morissette, and Anne-Marie Ninacs.

Artist's books 
A significant part of Louis-Pierre Bougie's printed oeuvre involved a dialogue with poetry in the form of collaborative exhibitions and, above all, artist's books that brought together the artistry of typographers, printmakers, poets, and bookbinders. Bougie created books with many poets, among them Gaston Miron, Paul Chamberland, Geneviève Letarte, Jérôme Élie, Michel Butor, Michel van Schendel, François-Xavier Marange, Paule Marier, and Michaël La Chance. Working closely with the authors, he contributed a distinctive sensibility that was both rough and sensitive, abrasive and idyllic. His artist's books were featured in the following exhibitions:
 1990 – Titre?, Bibliothèque des arts, Université du Québec à Montréal
 2005 – Titre?, Musée national des beaux-arts du Québec
 2007 – Actualité de l’estampe au Québec, Grande Bibliothèque, BAnQ (second iteration of exhibition originally presented in Québec City, 2005)
 2013 - Louis-Pierre Bougie – 30 ans de livres d'artiste, Centre d'archives de Montréal, BAnQ (curator: Claude Morissette)

Collections 
 Bibliothèque nationale d’Ottawa
 Bibliothèque et Archives nationales du Québec, Montréal
 Bibliothèque nationale de Paris
 Library of the University of North Carolina at Greensboro
 Musée d’Art Contemporain de Montréal
 Musée national des beaux-arts du Québec
 National Bank of Canada
 Caisses populaires Desjardins
 Groupe Laurentienne
 Provigo
 Loto-Québec
 New York Public Library
 Newark Public Library

Catalogs and monographs 
 2013 - Michaël La Chance, Louis-Pierre Bougie. Espaces chavirés, torsions du désir. Foreword by Isabelle de Mévius, preface by Georges Leroux. Montreal: Les Éditions de Mévius.
 2007 – Léo Rosshandler, Désert vert. Quebec City: Éditions Lacerte Art Contemporain - Galerie Orange.
 2005 – Sylvie Alix, Louis-Pierre Bougie: prix de la Fondation Monique et Robert Parizeau 2005. Ed. Anne-Marie Ninacs, with translations by C. Bilodeau and M. E. Elgue. Quebec City: Musée national des beaux-arts du Québec.
 2005 - Michel van Schendel, Absence de bruit. Quebec City: Éditions Lacerte Art Contemporain - Galerie Orange.
 2001 - Bernard Lévy, Études au quotidien. With poems by Paul Chamberland and Michaël La Chance. Quebec City: Éditions Galerie Madeleine Lacerte.
 1996 - Louis-Pierre Bougie, Journal d’exil, New York 1996. With texts and poems by Michaël La Chance, Jérôme Élie, Geneviève Letarte, François-Xavier Marange, and Paule Marier. Quebec City: Galerie Madeleine Lacerte.
 1996 – Louis-Pierre Bougie, Christine Palmiéri, Espace D. René Harrison, et al., De la monstruosité, expression des passions. Montreal : Jaune-Fusain.
 1991 - Michaël La Chance, Céline Mayrand, Morsures. Louis-Pierre Bougie Gravures et monotypes 1986-1990. Preface by Léo Rosshandler. Montreal: Éditions Promotion des arts Lavalin, Maison de la Culture Côte-des-Neiges, Atelier Circulaire.
 1978 - Louis-Pierre Bougie (dessins). Quebec City: Musée du Québec.

Selected solo exhibitions

2015 
UQAC and Galerie La Corniche, Chicoutimi
Galerie d'art du Centre culturel de l’Université de Sherbrooke, Sherbrooke
Galerie du Théâtre, Magog
Galerie d’art Jean-Claude Bergeron, Ottawa
Galerie atelier Circulaire, Montreal

2014 
Musée d'art contemporain de Baie St-Paul (retrospective), Baie St-Paul
Galerie Madeleine Lacerte, Quebec City
Centre d’arts Orford, Orford

2013 
Centre culturel 1700 La Poste (retrospective), Montreal        
Bibliothèque et archives nationales du Québec (30 ans de livres d’artiste), Montreal

2012 
Maison de la culture Marie-Uguay, Montreal
Bibliothèque de Sainte-Thérèse (retrospective), Sainte-Thérèse
Galerie Madeleine Lacerte, Quebec City
Maison de la culture Villeray - Parc-Extension (30 ans de livres d’artiste), Montreal

2007 
Galerie Orange, Montreal

2005 
Musée national des beaux-arts du Québec (Monique and Robert Parizeau Foundation Prize), Quebec City
Centre d'exposition de l'Université du Québec à Chicoutimi, Chicoutimi

2004 
Atelier Circulaire, Montreal
Galerie Orange, Montreal
Galerie Madeleine Lacerte, Quebec City

2003 
Galerie Pierre-Luc St-Laurent, Ottawa

2002 
Atelier Lacourière et Frélaut, Paris
Galerie Madeleine Lacerte, Quebec City
Galerie Pierre-Luc St-Laurent, Ottawa
Galerie Éric Devlin, Montreal

2001 
Calligraphic Centre, Winston-Salem, United States

2000 
Bibliothèque nationale du Québec, Quebec City
Atelier-Galerie Presse-papier (Festival de Poésie), Trois-Rivières
Calligraphic Centre, Winston-Salem, United States

1999 
Galerie Eric Devlin, Montreal
Galerie Madeleine Lacerte, Quebec City
Centre culturel de Saint-Jérôme

1998 
Galerie Nane Cailler, Lausanne, Switzerland

1997 
Galerie L’Autre Équivoque, Ottawa.

1996 
Galerie Madeleine Lacerte (Journal d’exil), Quebec City
Atelier Circulaire, Montreal
La Galerie Trois-Rivières (Festival de poésie), Trois-Rivières
Centre Culturel Henri Lemieux, Ville La Salle

1994 
Galerie Madeleine Lacerte, Quebec City
Galerie James Roussel, Montreal
Galerie L’Autre Équivoque, Ottawa

1993 
La Galerie, Trois-Rivières
Galerie Michèle Broutta, Paris, France

1992 
Galerie Nane Cailler, Lausanne, Switzerland

1991 
Maison de la Culture Côtes des Neiges (Promotion des arts Lavalin), Montreal
Susan Conway Gallery, Georgetown, Washington DC, United States
Michel Tétreault Art Contemporain, Montreal

1990 
Circa, Montreal
L'autre équivoque, Ottawa

1989 
Aire du Verseau, Paris (France)    
L'autre Équivoque, Ottawa

1988 
Galerie L'Aire du Verseau, Paris and Dijon, France
Michel Tétreault Art Contemporain, Montreal
Grand Palais à Paris (SAGA 88, FIAC Édition), France

1987 
Galerie Triangle, Brussels, Belgium

1986 
L'autre Équivoque, Ottawa

1986 
Michel Tétreault Art Contemporain, Montreal

1985 
Délégation du Québec à Paris, Paris, France

1984 
Galerie de l'Université de Moncton, Moncton
Radio-Canada, Moncton

1983 
Michel Tétreault Art Contemporain, Montreal

1982 
Galerie Jean-Jacques Thibeault, Montreal

1981 
Independent exhibition, Quebec City

1980 
Délégation du Québec à Paris, France
Studio exhibition, Montreal

1979 
Centre d'art du Mont-Royal, Montreal
Atelier Graff, Montreal
Studio exhibition, Montreal

1978 
Musée du Québec, Quebec City

1974 
Balcon les Images, Montreal
Galerie du Vieux Marché, Ottawa

1971–72 
Atelier Galerie Laurent Tremblay, Montreal

Artist books 
2013–15 - Ainsi fait, 13 engravings, text by François-Xavier Marange. Montreal-Paris: Éditions de la Griffe d’Acier.
2011 - Les mots griffonnés, 12 engravings, text by Michel van Schendel. Montreal-Paris: Éditions de la Griffe d’Acier.
2005 - Le jardinier, 17 engravings, text by Michel van Schendel. Montreal-Paris: Éditions de la Griffe d’Acier.
2004 - Terre brune, 25 engravings, poem by Michel van Schendel. Montreal-Paris: Éditions de la Griffe d’Acier.
2000 - Flou comme la nuit, 7 engravings on chine collé, poem by Geneviève Letarte. Saint-Lambert-Montreal: Éditions Bonfort and Éric Develin.
1996 - Rencontres, 16 engravings on Japan paper, texts by Paule Marier, François-Xavier Marange, Geneviève Letarte, and Jérôme Élie. Quebec City: Éditions Galerie Madeleine Lacerte.
1992 -  Entre deux eaux, 8 etchings and 4 tinted plates, text by Michel Butor. Montreal-Paris: Éditions de la Griffe d’Acier.
1992 - Les derniers outrages du ciel, 6 engravings, text by Michaël LaChance. Montreal-Paris: Éditions de la Griffe d’Acier.
1990 - Terminus Nord, 12 engravings on chine collé, poem by Geneviève Letarte. Montreal: Éditions Atelier Circulaire).
1987 - Forger l’Effroi, 12 colour etchings, text by Michaël LaChance, foreword by Gaston Miron. Montreal-Paris: Éditions de la Griffe d’Acier.
1983 - Le prince sans rire, 12 etchings, poem by Michaël LaChance, postface and poem by Gaston Miron. Montreal-Paris: Éditions Lui-même.
1977 - Le rendez-vous d’août, 5 lithographs, poem by Raymond Cloutier.
1975 - Doux le vent, 5 silkscreen prints, poem by Jean-Guy Charbonneau. Montreal : Guilde Graphique.

References 

1946 births
2021 deaths
Artists from Quebec
École des beaux-arts de Montréal alumni
French Quebecers
Deaths from pneumonia in Quebec